Hallville may refer to:

 Hallville, a hamlet in North Dundas, Ontario, Canada
 Hallville Historic and Archeological District in Exeter, Rhode Island, United States
 Hallville Mill Historic District, in Preston, Connecticut, United States

See also

 
 Hall (disambiguation)
 Ville (disambiguation)
 Hallsville (disambiguation)